The Fagaloa Bay – Uafato Tiavea Conservation Zone is located in the Va'a-o-Fonoti District of Samoa, on eastern Upolu Island.

Description 
The site is a nexus of sorts between the natural and cultural worlds: the largest tropical rain forest on any Pacific island with unique flora and fauna accompanied by the traditional Samoan cultural practices of Fa'a Samoa and the matai system.

World Heritage Status 

This site was added to the UNESCO World Heritage Tentative List on December 21, 2006, in the Mixed (Cultural + Natural) category.

See also
List of protected areas of Samoa
Samoan plant names, includes scientific and English names. Many used in traditional Samoan medicine.
Geography of Samoa

Notes

References 
Fagaloa Bay - Uafato Tiavea Conservation Zone - UNESCO World Heritage Centre Accessed 2009-03-03.

Geography of Samoa
Environment of Samoa
Nature conservation in Samoa
Protected areas of Samoa
Va'a-o-Fonoti